Owia is a town in Saint Vincent and the Grenadines. It is located in the northeast of the main island of Saint Vincent, close to the nation's northernmost point, Porter Point.

References

Populated places in Saint Vincent and the Grenadines